ARMM Regional Science High School 
is the Regional Science High School for the Autonomous Region in Muslim Mindanao. It is a public science high school supervised by the Department of Education. The school is the former Parang National High School - Landasan Campus - Amir Bara Lidasan National High School. It became the Regional Science High School for Autonomous Region in Muslim Mindanao in 1996. It is located in Landasan, Parang, Maguindanao, Philippines.

In 2009, the five-classroom donated by Embassy of Japan was completed in support of peace and development initiatives in conflict-affected areas in Mindanao. Such initiative boosted the institution to become the center for excellence in science and in mathematics in the region.

Admission
Students who belong to upper 10% of the Grade 6 graduating class, recommended by their respective principals are qualified to take the entrance exam.

To acquire an entrance examination form, examinees should have:
 A final grade of 85% in English, Science and Mathematics
 A final grade of 83% in all other learning areas, and
 A weighted average of at least 85%.

Students should maintain a grade of 85 for major subjects and 83 in minor subjects. If a student fails to meet this requirement, he or she would be put under probation for the following year. If the student still fails to meet the requirements he or she will be due to disqualification, hence, he or she is to transfer to another school by the end of the school year.

References

Regional Science High School Union
Science high schools in the Philippines
Schools in Maguindanao del Norte